is a Japanese voice actor and narrator. He was affiliated with Troubador Music Office until March 2010. He then worked as freelance until April 2011, when he was employed by Kenyu Office.

Filmography

Television animation
Mobile Suit Gundam ZZ (1986), Ino Abbav
Animated Classics of Japanese Literature (1986), Bunji, Kenji
Metal Armor Dragonar (1987–88), Kaine Wakaba
Kimagure Orange Road (1987–88), Yusaku Hino
Brave Exkaiser (1990), Blue Raker, Ultra Raker
Chibi Maruko-chan (1990), Kazuhiko Hanawa, Mimatsuya, Misawa, Negishi, Watanabe
Jankenman (1991), Janken Car
Floral Magician Mary Bell (1992), George
Aoki Densetsu Shoot (1993), Kazuhiro Hiramatsu
The Brave Express Might Gaine (1993), Mitsuhiko Hamada, Bird Bomber, Jet Diver
Captain Tsubasa J (1995), Shingo Aoi
Tenchi Muyo! (1995), Tenchi Masaki
Hunter × Hunter (1999), Wing
Grappler Baki (2001), Baki Hanma
PaRappa the Rapper (2001), PJ Berri
Comic Party (2001), Kazuki Sendō
Captain Tsubasa ~ Road to 2002 (2001), Gino Hernandez, Alan Pascal
Di Gi Charat Nyo! (2003–04), Daifuku Ankoro
Cromartie High School (2003), Ken Hirai
Oh My Goddess! (2005), Keiichi Morisato
Comic Party Revolution (2005), Kazuki Sendō
Air Gear (2006), Onigiri
Hunter × Hunter (2011), Zepile
Dragon Ball Super (2016), Monaka, Vermoud

Unknown date
Daigunder, Howard
Digimon Adventure, Joe Kido, Additional Voices
Digimon Adventure 02, Joe Kido, Jim Kido, Daemon
Digimon Tamers, Dolphin
Digimon Frontier, Neemon
Digimon Savers, Akihiro Kurata, Belphemon
Digimon Xros Wars, Tuwarmon/Damemon
Goldfish Warning!, Michael
Groove Adventure RAVE, Sieg Hart
Zatch Bell!, Kanchomé
Maburaho, Taki
One Piece, Kelly Funk, Kabu, Pound, Donquixote Mjosgard, Charlotte Anglais, Mouse-Man, Doran
The Cobi Troupe, Jordy
The Prince of Tennis, Hiroshi Wakato
Ranma ½, Copycat Ken
Rurouni Kenshin, Ryūzaburō Higashiyama
Urusei Yatsura

Original video animation (OVA)
Legend of the Galactic Heroes (1989), Konrad von Modell
Otaku no Video (1991), Miyoshi
Tenchi Muyo! Ryo-Ohki (1992) - Tenchi Masaki
Oh My Goddess! (1993–94), Keiichi Morisato
Sonic the Hedgehog (1996), Sonic the Hedgehog, Metal Sonic

Films
Super Mario Bros.: The Great Mission to Rescue Princess Peach! (1986), Prince Haru
The Venus Wars (1989), Lob
Pretty Soldier Sailor Moon S (1994), Kakeru Ōzora
Tenchi Muyo in Love! (1996) – Tenchi Masaki
Doraemon: Nobita and the Galaxy Super-express (1996), Tamako
Digimon Adventure (1999), Joe Kido
Ah! My Goddess: The Movie (2000), Keiichi Morisato
Digimon Adventure: Our War Game! (2000), Joe Kido, Kinu
Konjiki no Gash Bell!! Movie 1: Unlisted Demon 101 (2004), Kanchomé
The Legend of the Galactic Heroes: Die Neue These Seiran (2019), Boris Konev

Tokusatsu
Doubutsu Sentai Zyuohger (2016), Dorobozu (ep. 14)

Video games
Another Century's Episode series (????–), Kaine Wakaba, Dunkel Cooper
Super Robot Wars series (????–), Kaine Wakaba, Ino Abbav, Dunkel Cooper
Tales of Rebirth (2004), (Saleh)
Konjiki no Gash Bell series (????–), Kanchome

Drama CDs
Abunai series 4: Abunai Campus Love (????), Harumi Okikura
Catch Me! (????), Shikyou Katayama
C Kara Hajimaru Koi mo Ii (????), Takenoshin
Eien no Midori ~Nochinoomohini~ (????), Junya Shibasaki
Koisuru Jewelry Designer series 1 (????), Yuutarou Mori
My Sexual Harassment series 3 (????), Shun Kazami
Onegai Darlin''' (????), Kouchirou ImadaOurin Gakuen series 1: Ikenai Seitokaishitsu (????), Shuuichirou Kazama

DubbingDoug (U.S. TV 1991, Japanese dub 1998), Skeeter ValentineVeggieTales (U.S. direct-to-video 1993, Japanese dub 1998), Bob the Tomato

References

 Gifford, Kevin. "The Official Art of Comic Party Revolution". (March 2007) Newtype USA''. pp. 103–109.

External links
Masami Kikuchi at Kenyu Office
 

Masami Kikuchi at Ryu's Seiyuu Info

 Masami Kikuchi at GamePlaza-Haruka Voice Acting Database 
 Masami Kikuchi at Hitoshi Doi's Seiyuu Database

1960 births
Living people
People from Nagano Prefecture
Japanese male voice actors